Myanmar Airways may refer to:

Myanmar National Airlines, a state-owned airline and the flag carrier of Myanmar, based in Yangon
Myanmar Airways International, a privately owned airline in Yangon, Myanmar